A steppe is an ecological zone consisting of plains generally lacking trees.

Steppe may also refer to:

Places
Eurasian Steppe, a vast ecoregion from Mongolia to Hungary
Steppes, Tasmania, Australia

Arts and entertainment
The Steppes (band), an Irish American band
The Steppe (film), a 1977 Soviet drama film
The Steppe (novella), an 1888 work by Anton Chekhov
"The Steppe", an instrumental by Jeff Lorber Fusion from Hacienda (2013)

People with the surname
Brook Steppe (born 1959), American former professional basketball player
Harry Steppe (1888–1934), Jewish-American vaudeville actor

See also
The Jewish Steppe, a 2001 documentary about Soviet Jews